Moses Walton (January 14, 1826 – June 15, 1883) was a nineteenth-century Virginia lawyer who during the American Civil War served in the Virginia House of Delegates from September 7, 1863 until the war's end, and later in the Virginia Constitutional Convention of 1868.

Early and family life
The son of Reuben Moore Walton and his wife, the former Mary Ann Harrison (1807-1879), Moses was named for his paternal grandfather, Moses Walton (1775-1847), who had been sheriff of Shenandoah County, as well as serving in both houses of the Virginia General Assembly. He read law and became a lawyer, as did his younger brother David Harrison Walton (1830-1876).

Moses Walton married Emily Marie Lauck on February 5, 1851. Their children included Annie E. Walton Campbell (1852-1878), Morgan Lauck Walton (1854-1935), Mary O. Walton Newman (1855-1942), Emma M. Walton (1858-), Samuel Walton (1859-), Alice Heiskell Walton Haslett (1862-1950) and David Harrison Walton (1865-1927).

Career

Walton practiced law in Woodstock, the Shenandoah County, Virginia county seat both before and after the American Civil War. He owned at least one enslaved person before the war began, as had some relatives.

After Virginia seceded from the Union, his younger brother (and lawyer) David Harrison Walton organized the 33rd Virginia Infantry in which two other relatives also served and survived the war. However, Moses Walton's initial involvement was signing a "memorial" to the Confederate President and Virginia's governor on August 12, 1861 complaining about the hardship caused by excessive conscription from Shenandoah County, since 12,829 persons would be required to furnish 1269 men, and actually furnished 900 men, to the great disadvantage of their families who needed to plant the fall crop, since the county only had 443 slaves older than 12 years and 150 free negroes.

In 1863, Shenandoah County voters elected Moses Walton and Philip Pittman to represent them in the Virginia House of Delegates. After Virginia ceded defeat, Walton took the required loyalty oath and practiced law in Woodstock with his brother David Harrison Walton. Shenandoah and Page County voters elected Moses Walton and Dr. George W. Rust their delegates to the Virginia Constitutional Convention of 1868. A Conservative as was Dr. George Rust, Walton opposed various penalties that the majority proposed to impose upon former Confederates.

After the deaths of his parents and brother/law partner in the 1870s, Mose Walton moved his family to Stonewall in Shenandoah county, and before his death practiced law with his son Morgan Lauck Walton (who favored his middle name) as Walton & Walton.

Death

Moses Walton died on June 15, 1883 and was buried at Massanutten Cemetery in Woodstock. His widow survived for nearly a quarter century and saw their son M.L. Walton elected to represent Shenandoah and Page Counties as a Democrat in the Virginia Senate in 1891.

References 

People from Shenandoah County, Virginia
Virginia lawyers
People of Virginia in the American Civil War
Members of the Virginia House of Delegates
19th-century American politicians
1826 births
1883 deaths
People from Woodstock, Virginia
19th-century American lawyers